"Shit's Real", also known by its censored title "It's Real", is the first single released by rapper Mic Geronimo. It appears on his debut studio album The Natural (1995).

Background and composition
Produced by a then-unknown Irv Gotti (then known as DJ Irv), "Shit's Real" was the first song Mic Geronimo ever recorded. After meeting Irv at a high school talent show, Geronimo and Irv came together to record a single, which became "Shit's Real". The song uses a looped sample of "Free" by Deniece Williams, and finds Mic Geronimo rapping about his daily routine.

The single became an underground classic and made it to three different Billboard charts including 23 on the Hot Rap Singles chart. After Geronimo signed with TVT, "Shit's Real" was included on Geronimo's debut album The Natural.

Track listing

A-side
"Shit's Real" – 3:59
"Hemmin Heads" – 4:56
"Shit's Real" (instrumental) – 3:54
"Hemmin Heads" (instrumental) – 4:56

B-side
"It's Real"- 3:55
"Hemmin Heads" (radio version) – 4:56
"Hemmin Heads" (Cheeba version) – 4:48
"Shit's Real" (a cappella) – 3:55

Charts

References

1994 debut singles
1994 songs
Mic Geronimo songs
Song recordings produced by Irv Gotti
Songs written by Irv Gotti
TVT Records singles